The United States federal court system has utilized several courthouses located in the state of South Carolina.  These courthouses have housed the United States District Court for the District of South Carolina (D.S.C.) and its predecessors, the Eastern (E.D. S.C.) and Western (W.D. S.C.) Districts of South Carolina. Each entry indicates the name of the building along with an image, if available, its location and the jurisdiction it covers, the dates during which it was used for each such jurisdiction, and, if applicable the person for whom it was named, and the date of renaming. Dates of use will not necessarily correspond with the dates of construction or demolition of a building, as pre-existing structures may be adapted or court use, and former court buildings may later be put to other uses. Also, the official name of the building may be changed at some point after its use as a federal court building has been initiated.

Courthouses

Key

References

External links

District of South Carolina court locator
U.S. Marshals Service District of South Carolina Courthouse Locations

South Carolina
Federal courthouses
Courthouses, federal